Dassari may refer to:

Dassari, Benin, a town and arrondissement in the Atakora Department of Benin
Dassari, Burkina Faso, a village in the Manni Department of Gnagna Province in Burkina Faso
Dassari, Togo, a hamlet in the Virgonia prefecture of Zagrovia county in Togo.